The 1983 Louisiana gubernatorial election was held to elect the Governor of Louisiana. Incumbent Republican Governor Dave Treen lost re-election to a second term, defeated by former Democratic Governor  Edwin Edwards. Edwards became the first governor since Earl Long to win non-consecutive terms. He also became the first to serve three full terms (later a fourth in 1991).

Under Louisiana's jungle primary system, all candidates appear on the same ballot, regardless of party, and voters may vote for any candidate, regardless of their party affiliation. A runoff would be held if no candidate received an absolute majority of the vote during the primary election. On October 12, 1983, Edwards and Treen took the two highest popular vote counts, but a runoff election was not held as Edwards won over 50% of the vote in the primary.

Background 

In this election, the first round of voting was held on October 22, 1983.  Since Edwards won more than 50% of the votes on the first round, no runoff was needed. The runoff for other statewide offices which required one was November 19, 1983. 

Treen became the first of three consecutive Louisiana governors to be denied re-election. Edwards himself was defeated by north Louisiana U.S. Representative Buddy Roemer in 1987, refusing to contest the runoff after trailing Roemer in the primary. Edwards came back in 1991, and along with former Ku Klux Klan leader David Duke, combined to oust Roemer in the primary before Edwards routed Duke in the runoff to win a fourth gubernatorial term.

This was the first time that any contestant for the governors election in Louisiana received at least one million votes. Edwards also won 62 out of 64 parishes against Treen. Treen only carried Jefferson Parish, where he resided at the time; and St. Tammany Parish, where he would eventually move following completion of his term.

Results

Videos
(1) Gubernatorial Debate on September 7, 1983 

(2) Gubernatorial Debate on September 14, 1983 

(3) Election Special from LPB on October 21, 1983, detailing in-depth report on the statewide primary elections 

(4) Edwin Edwards Campaign Commercial "Edwin Edwards....Now" 

(5) Profile of Edwin Edwards from WWL-TV New Orleans on October 22, 1983 

(6) Edwards Victory Speech after winning landslide re-election to third term on WWL-TV New Orleans on October 22, 1983 

(7) LPB Coverage on the Primary Recap from October 28, 1983

References 

1983
Louisiana
Gubernatorial
October 1983 events in the United States